Lytta biguttata is a species of blister beetle in the family Meloidae. It is found in Central America and North America.

References

Further reading

 
 

Meloidae
Articles created by Qbugbot
Beetles described in 1853